The Southern Poverty Law Center (SPLC) is an American nonprofit civil rights organization.

SPLC may also refer to:

Software Product Line Conference, an annual international conference
Student Press Law Center, an American nonprofit journalism organization headquartered in Washington, D.C.
Standard Point Location Code, a 9 digit geographic code used by North American transportation industries.
St. Peter’s Lutheran Church. a Lutheran church located in the eastern suburbs of Hobart, Australia
St Peters Lutheran College, a private Lutheran prep12 college in Brisbane, Australia